The Challenge Yellow, also known as Challenge Sedis, was a prize given yearly by the chain company Sedis to the best cyclists in the French races from 1931 to 1982. The winner was unofficially seen as the best cyclist in the French cycling season.

As a reaction, the Super Prestige Pernod was founded in 1958.

List of winners

References

External links
List of winners 

Cycle racing in France